Pennyworth, marketed as Pennyworth: The Origin of Batman's Butler for its third season, is an American television series that premiered on July 28, 2019, on Epix, based on DC Comics' Batman character of the same name. The series was developed for television and is executive produced by Bruno Heller and Danny Cannon, and stars Jack Bannon as Alfred Pennyworth, a younger version of the iteration of the character previously portrayed by Sean Pertwee in Heller's and Cannon's Fox series Gotham (2014–2019), with the series serving as a prequel to both Gotham, and V for Vendetta, by Alan Moore, David Lloyd, and Tony Weare. Ben Aldridge, Hainsley Lloyd Bennett, Ryan Fletcher, Dorothy Atkinson, Emma Paetz, Paloma Faith, Polly Walker, James Purefoy, and Jason Flemyng also star.

The second season began filming in January 2020, but the filming was paused in March due to the COVID-19 pandemic. The second season premiered on December 13, 2020. In October 2021, it was announced that the series would premiere on HBO Max for its third season, although it would still continue to air on Epix in addition. The third season premiered on October 6, 2022, and concluded on November 24, 2022. In February 2023, the series was canceled after three seasons.

Premise
Pennyworth explores the early life of the titular Wayne family butler, Alfred Pennyworth, a former British soldier of the Special Air Service (SAS), years before the events of Gotham. After serving in the Malayan Emergency, he aims to form his own security company in an alternate history London, which combines aspects of the Mid 1960s with invented events and practices inspired by V for Vendetta, such as a modern civil war and televised public executions.

In the first two seasons, Alfred becomes a target of the fascist Raven Society, a group conspiring to take over the British government, working against them with American agents of the CIA-affiliated No Name League, Thomas Wayne and Martha Kane, the future parents of Bruce Wayne, to whom is born his older future-long-lost sister, Samantha Thomas Wayne, in the second-season finale.

Cast and characters

Main

 Jack Bannon as Alfred Pennyworth, a former British SAS soldier who worked as a bouncer at an exclusive London club while starting up his own security firm, Pennyworth Security, and later runs his own club, The Delaney. The character was specifically developed from Michael Caine's portrayal of the character in The Dark Knight trilogy, directed by Christopher Nolan. Caine's portrayal includes a previous background as a member of the British SAS. Despite this, the character is a younger version of the iteration previously portrayed by Sean Pertwee in Gotham.
 Ben Aldridge as Thomas Wayne, a wealthy young American forensic accountant and doctor from Gotham City who is impressed with Alfred's skills and later hires him. Wayne was secretly an agent of the CIA, working undercover in the No Name League before returning to being a doctor.
 Hainsley Lloyd Bennett as Deon "Bazza" Bashford (seasons 1–2), a playboy and longtime friend of Alfred who served with him in the army.
 Ryan Fletcher as Wallace "Daveboy" MacDougal, another longtime friend of Alfred who has a drinking problem and served with him in the army.
 Dorothy Atkinson as Mary Pennyworth, Alfred's mother who supports her son in his pursuits whilst remaining concerned for his safety.
 Atkinson also portrays Virginia Devereaux (season 3), who uses Mary's appearance to trick the Waynes.
 Ian Puleston-Davies as Arthur Pennyworth (seasons 1–2), Alfred's father, who works as a butler. After his presumed death during an assassination attempt on the Queen, he is kept alive by a life-support wheelchair built by the Raven Union.
 Paloma Faith as Bet Sykes, a sadistic sociopath who initially works as an enforcer for the Raven Society and later a captain in the Raven Union. She becomes attached to Alfred's girlfriend Esme while holding her hostage. After her death, she later becomes a P.W.E. when she's resurrected, giving her enhanced physical strength.
 Jason Flemyng as Lord James Harwood (seasons 1–2), the former leader of the Raven Society and later its successor the Raven Union, who is conspiring to take control of the British government.
 Polly Walker as Margaret "Peggy" Sykes, Bet's sister who is the matriarch of the Sykes family and one of Lancashire's most successful dominatrixes. She is also an enforcer for the Raven Society.
 Emma Paetz as Martha Wayne (née Kane), an American agent for the No Name League, and later its successor the English League, who hires Alfred to assist her on dangerous missions. She develops a crush on Alfred during their missions and a budding friendship with Thomas, later leading to a relationship with the latter and eventual marriage. She later gives birth to a daughter, Samantha Thomas Wayne, the future-long-lost sister of Bruce Wayne.
 Ramon Tikaram as Detective Inspector / Prime Minister Victor Aziz (seasons 2–3; recurring season 1), a high-ranking detective in the London Metropolitan Police, who later becomes the Prime Minister of the United Kingdom.
 Harriet Slater as Sandra Onslow (seasons 2–3; recurring season 1), the daughter of Sid Onslow and a bartender who is romantically interested in Alfred. She later becomes a professional singer at Alfred's club and is pregnant with his child.
 Edward Hogg as Colonel John Salt (seasons 2–3), a high-ranking officer in the Raven Union who develops the experimental chemical weapon, Stormcloud. He later becomes a P.W.E. after replacing parts of his body with cybernetic ones to keep himself alive.
 Jessye Romeo as Katie Browning (season 2), an art student whose life is changed by the Raven Union, who later develops a close relationship with Bet Sykes.
 James Purefoy as Captain Gulliver "Gully" Troy / Captain Blighty (seasons 2–3), Alfred's former SAS captain and the leader of a crew of criminals consisting of former soldiers. He later becomes the first P.W.E. (person with enhancements) and serves the government as the enhanced super-soldier Captain Blighty after consuming and merging with Stormcloud. Purefoy, who is billed as "special guest star" for the second season, previously initially portrayed V in the 2005 V for Vendetta film adaptation, before leaving six weeks into filming, with Hugo Weaving replacing him.
 Simon Manyonda as Lucius Fox (season 3; recurring season 2), a young scientist who works for the CIA to infiltrate the Raven Union, later becoming a member of the English League. The character is a younger version of the iteration previously portrayed by Chris Chalk in Gotham.

Recurring
 Emma Corrin as Esme Winikus (season 1), a nightclub dancer and aspiring actress who falls in love with Alfred.
 Richard Clothier as the Prime Minister of the United Kingdom (season 1), the Head of Government for the UK who works to keep the No Name League and the Raven Society in check.
 Ben Wiggins as "Spanish" (season 1), a SAS officer and friend of Alfred who died in Malaya during the Malayan Emergency. He appears to Alfred in flashbacks and hallucinations.
 Jessica Ellerby as the Queen of England (seasons 1–2), the head of state for England and later the leader of the English League.
 Saikat Ahamed as Mr. Chadley, the manager for Pennyworth Security and later Alfred's club.
 Danny Webb as John Ripper / The Ripper (seasons 1–2), a local crime lord based in Whitechapel and descendant of Jack the Ripper, who kills people for sport.
 Freddy Carter as Jason Ripper (season 1), John Ripper's nephew who works for his uncle's crime syndicate.
 Simon Day as Sid Onslow (seasons 1–2), Sandra Onslow's father and the landlord of the Severed Arms, a local pub frequented by Alfred, Daveboy, and Bazza.
 Jennie Goossens as Mrs. Spicer (season 1), Mr. Spicer's wife who serves Peggy Sykes.
 Steve Edwin as Mr. Spicer (season 1), Mrs. Spicer's husband who serves Peggy Sykes.
 Charlie Woodward as Captain John Curzon (season 1), a retired military Captain who has a personal vendetta against Alfred.
 Anna Chancellor as Dr. Frances Gaunt (seasons 1–2; guest season 3), a physician and the new leader of the Raven Society and later a high-ranking member of its successor, the Raven Union.
 Sarah Alexander as Undine Thwaite (season 1), the new leader of the No Name League.
 Jessica Claire as Vikki Dufrench (season 2), John Salt's mistress and a famous actress.
 Sharon Ballard as Ruby Carmichael (season 2), a high-ranking member of The English League.
 Sally Tatum as Miss Dixon (season 2; guest season 3), the secretary for the Raven Union. She later has a young daughter, Julie, who is "adopted" by Bet Sykes.
 Jessica De Gouw as Melanie Troy (season 2), Gulliver Troy's estranged wife who takes a liking to Alfred.
 Suzanne Boreel as Rita (season 2), a member of Gulliver's Troy's crew of criminals.
 Faisal Mohammed as Monty (season 2), a member of Troy's crew.
 Tristram Wymark as General Nelson Thursday (seasons 2–3), the commander-in-chief of the British Army and the Field Marshal for the Raven Union. He later becomes the leader of Level-7, a secret government operation that works to create and control P.W.E. in London.
 Lorraine Burroughs as Virginia Devereaux (season 3), a high-ranking CIA official who travels with Patrick Wayne to England. She is later revealed to be a P.W.E who can alter her appearance to copy someone else.
 Richard Dillane as Patrick Wayne (season 3), Thomas Wayne's father and the CEO of Wayne Enterprises.
 Paul Brightwell as Dr. Robert Glubb (season 3), a former employee of Wayne Enterprises and the creator of the psycho-kinetic drug, Lullaby State. 
 Jayda Eyles as Samantha Thomas Wayne (season 3), the young daughter of Thomas and Martha Wayne. She is often cared for by Mary Pennyworth, who acts as her nanny.
 Tachia Newall as Jez (season 3), a P.W.E. who has a cybernetic arm with a mind of its own.
 Loreece Harrison as Celia (season 3), a P.W.E. whose eyes force others into a hypnotic trance, so she's forced to wear a pair of cybernetic goggles.
 Claudia Jolly as Sally Prufrock (season 3), a rich socialite who befriends Daveboy and is one of Francis' followers.
 Paul Kaye as Francis Foulkes (season 3), a flamboyant artist hoping to change the world by using the mind control drug Lullaby State in an attempt to control the minds of his followers, and later the population of London. A predecessor to V, he and his followers hide their identities behind Guy Fawkes masks.
 Oliver Ryan as Roger Hammond (season 3), a kind divorcee who meets Mary through a "Lonely Hearts" newspaper advert.

Guest
 Salóme Gunnarsdóttir as Patricia Wayne, Thomas Wayne's sister and an American socialite.
 Melissa Knatchbull as Clarissa Harwood (season 1), James Harwood's wife.
 Peter Guinness as General Malcolm (season 1), an honourable high-ranking officer in the British Army.
 Jonjo O'Neill as Aleister Crowley (seasons 1–2), a Satanist who hosts lavish parties for London's elite.
 Rosa Coduri as Sheri (season 2), a waitress at Alfred's club.
 Gretchen Egolf as Dallas (season 2), Thomas Wayne's superior in the CIA.
 Lee McQueen as Vic Dobson (season 2), a funfair traveller who frequents Alfred's club.
 Ed Sayer as Banjo (season 2), a member of Troy's crew.
 Amanda Dahl as Jessica Thistle (season 3), the missing daughter of Lord and Lady Thistle who is affected by the Lullaby State drug.
 Jing Lusi as Zahra Khin (season 3), the daughter of a prominent politician from the fictional island nation of Kalpoor and the leader of the separatist movement, the Kalpoor Freedom Party,
 David Yip as Zeya Khin (season 3), Zahra's father and a former politician from Kalpoor.
 Chi Lewis-Parry as Kevin / Blue Raven (season 3), a P.W.E. who is the Raven Union's attempt to create an enhanced super-soldier like Captain Blighty, and exhibits similar abilities.
 Alexis Rodney as Darren Thompson (season 3), a P.W.E. with electrokinesis powers.

Episodes

Season 1 (2019)

Season 2 (2020–21)

Season 3 (2022)

Production

Development
Epix gave the production a series order for the first season consisting of ten episodes in May 2018, a prequel to the Fox series Gotham. The pilot episode was written by Bruno Heller and directed by Danny Cannon, both of whom are also showrunners and executive producers. Production companies involved with the series include Warner Horizon Television. At the 2019 Television Critics Association's annual winter press tour held in February, the series was confirmed to premiere in June 2019. The premiere date was revised to July 28, 2019, on Epix. The day following the series premiere, on July 29, 2019, Cannon confirmed that Pennyworth would serve as a loose prequel to V for Vendetta as well as a direct prequel to Gotham, with the British Civil War depicted in the series' first season eventually leading to the formation of the Norsefire government of V for Vendetta. Characters wearing V's Guy Fawkes mask were later introduced in the series' third season, set five years after the first two seasons, with Heller confirming a direct crossover would take place in October 2022.

Season two began filming in January 2020; it premiered December 13, 2020. On February 1, 2023, HBO Max canceled the series after three seasons.

Casting
Jack Bannon, Ben Aldridge, Ryan Fletcher, Hainsley Lloyd Bennett, Paloma Faith, and Jason Flemyng had been cast in series regular roles in October 2018, with Bannon starring as the lead title character. Polly Walker had joined the cast in a recurring capacity in December.

Emma Paetz and Jessica Ellerby were cast in the series as Martha Kane and The Queen, respectively in March 2019. James Purefoy, who was previously cast (and replaced) as V in V for Vendetta (2005), was later cast in the second and third seasons of the series as Captain Gulliver "Gully" Troy / Captain Blighty.

Filming
Principal photography for the series commenced on October 22, 2018, at Warner Bros. Studios, Leavesden in Leavesden, Hertfordshire, England. Additionally, a number of shots were taken in London, including selecting the landmark building Florin Court as the home and neighbourhood of one of the series lead characters. Various scenes were filmed at Chatham Dockyard in Kent, where the streets stood in for East London in the 1960s. Principal photography for the series wrapped on May 24, 2019.

Reception
On Rotten Tomatoes, the first season has an approval rating of 73% based on 30 reviews, with an average rating of 7.30/10. The website's critical consensus reads: "While intriguing characters and impressive set-pieces make for an engaging spy-thriller, Pennyworth doesn't add much to the greater Batman mythos." On Metacritic the series has a weighted average score of 60 out of 100 based on reviews from nine critics, indicating "mixed or average reviews".

Writing for The A.V. Club, Sam Barsanti gives the program a C, noting: "[Pennyworth] would almost be more entertaining if you changed some of the names and jettisoned the comic book connection entirely—at least then there'd be no distracting questions about why Thomas Wayne has a sister and why he's secretly working for the government instead of becoming a rich doctor back home. As it stands, though, the show is as entertaining as it is frustrating, feeling sort of like an adaptation of a comic based on Guy Ritchie's Sherlock Holmes movies (with all of the Britishness that implies)."

On Rotten Tomatoes, the second season has an approval rating of 60% based on 5 reviews.

Broadcast
In the United States, the series premiered on July 28, 2019, on Epix. In Canada, the series premiered on Showcase on September 4, six weeks behind the Epix schedule. Pennyworth season one received its UK premiere on StarzPlay on Friday, October 25. Starting with its third season, the series would move to HBO Max with Epix receiving a second-run window. The third season, subtitled The Origin of Batman's Butler, and loosely adapting V for Vendetta, premiered on October 6, 2022, on HBO Max.

Tie-in comic
A tie-in comic of the titular character, set after the events of the third season during the Cold War, was released in August 2021. The story is written by Scott Bryan Wilson with interior art duties handled by Juan Gedeon.

Notes

References

External links
 

 
2010s American crime drama television series
2020s American crime drama television series
2019 American television series debuts
2022 American television series endings
Alternate history television series
American thriller television series
Batman television series
English-language television shows
MGM+ original programming
HBO Max original programming
Television series by Warner Horizon Television
Television series by Warner Bros. Television Studios
Television shows based on DC Comics
Television shows filmed in England
Television shows shot in Kent
Television shows shot in London
Television shows set in London
Television series set in the 1960s
Television productions suspended due to the COVID-19 pandemic
V for Vendetta
Cultural depictions of Elizabeth II